Lucihormetica verrucosa is a species of giant cockroach in the family Blaberidae, commonly known as the warty glowspot cockroach. It is native to Venezuela and Colombia.

Description
It is sexually dimorphic, with males being slightly smaller than females and having a pair of large, usually yellow spots on the pronotum. These are covered by a thin translucent cuticle and have traditionally been thought to be luminescent organs. However researchers noticed that when in captivity these cockroaches were fed on carrots, the colour of the spots deepened to orange or even red. On closer examination the surface of the cuticle bears a number of small knobs each bearing a small mechanoreceptor. The upper surface of the spots is partially obscured by a pad of enlarged fat body cells which accumulate carotenoids on a diet of carrots. Insects are unable to synthesize carotenoids and the presence of orange or red spots may indicate a well-fed, fit individual. The researchers found no evidence of light emission but hypothesized that the pigmented spots may play a part in male aggression or mate choice by the female, or may provide warning signals.

Distribution
L. verrucosa is native to Venezuela and Colombia.

Behaviour
Both sexes of L. verrucosa have short wings but dwell on the ground and are reluctant to fly. It is mainly nocturnal and hides during the day.

Courtship usually starts with the male stimulating the female, first with his antennae then with his palps. He then pursues her, pushes her, tries to climb on her back and raises his wings. She 
may run away or she may allow herself to be pushed and starts palpating the male's abdomen with her palps, climbs on the male and allows him to grasp her genitalia, dismounts sideways and turns through 180° so that the pair are linked at the tip of the abdomen. Copulation usually lasts for about an hour. Not every courtship resulted in a mating, the female often turns away half way through, or may climb on the back of the male without proceeding to copulation. Unlike other cockroaches such as the Pacific beetle cockroach (Diploptera punctata) and the orange-headed cockroach (Eublaberus posticus), the females are not receptive just after moulting and it is about twenty days later that they become receptive, by which time their cuticle is well-hardened.

References

Cockroaches
Insects described in 1865